The Beecher Falls–East Hereford Border Crossing connects the towns of East Hereford, Quebec, (formerly Comins Mills) and the village of Beecher Falls, Vermont, on the Canada–United States border. It is reached by Vermont Route 253 on the American side and by Quebec Route 253 on the Canadian side. Both the Canadian and the U.S. stations are open 24 hours a day. Whilst the Canadian station is open for commercial traffic, this is only on a more limited basis. The U.S. station facilities, built in the 1930s, was listed on the National Register of Historic Places in 2014.

Setting
The Canada–United States border between the province of Quebec and the state of Vermont is basically a straight east–west line, whose eastern end is at Halls Stream, a south-flowing tributary of the Connecticut River. The Vermont village of Beecher Falls is located just west of the mouth of Halls Stream; its northernmost business, a manufacturing facility of the Ethan Allen Furniture Company, directly abuts the border between Vermont Route 253 and Halls Stream.  The Quebec side of the border is rural, with woods and fields in the immediate vicinity.

The crossing is one of 15 in Vermont and is three miles (4.8 km) from the Canaan–Hereford Road Border Crossing. A US Border Patrol regional headquarters is between the two. The crossing point is formed by the junction of Vermont Route 253 and Quebec Route 253.

A line house once stood on the boundary line at this crossing. The house was used during the Prohibition era, as Americans flocked to the border for drinks. In the 1920s, there were three bridges that crossed between Comins Mills and New Hampshire across Halls Stream. At the time there was no US Customs presence at these crossings so travelers were expected to proceed to Beecher Falls to report.  In 1929, all three bridges were destroyed in a flood.

Canadian station
The original East Hereford border station was built in the 1930s and was often referred to as "Comin's Crossing".  It was a single-story white hip-roofed wooden structure with an integrated single-story canopy.  This border station style was used frequently at many border crossings built in this era. This building was replaced with the current facility of a similar design in 1960.

U.S. station

The U.S. station is located abutting the border on the west side of Vermont Route 253, opposite the Ethan Allen plant.  Its main building is a 1 ½ story brick Georgian Revival building, with a dormered gambrel roof and end chimneys. A metal porte cochère extends across two lanes to shelter vehicles as they are processed. The front facade of the building is five bays wide, with a central entrance flanked by sash windows. Single-story wings, formerly housing four bays of inspection garages, extend to either side of the main block.  Two of the left-side bays have been enclosed, and now house restroom facilities. The interior of the main block is symmetrically divided into areas for processing customs on one side and immigration on the other, with additional office space and holding cells on the attic level.

The station was built in 1932, as part of a general U.S. government program to improve border security.  This program was prompted by changes in immigration law resulting in increased illegal immigration, as well as the increased use of the automobile for personal travel and an increase in smuggling occasioned by Prohibition in the 1920s. The station is a little-altered version of one of several standardized designs produced by the United States Treasury Department Architect as part of the program.

See also
 List of Canada–United States border crossings
 National Register of Historic Places listings in Essex County, Vermont

References

Canada–United States border crossings
Transportation buildings and structures in Essex County, Vermont
Buildings and structures in Canaan, Vermont
Geography of Estrie
Government buildings on the National Register of Historic Places in Vermont
National Register of Historic Places in Essex County, Vermont
1926 establishments in Quebec
1926 establishments in Vermont